Beril Böcekler (born 7 February 2004) is a Turkish competitive swimmer in freestyle. She is a member of Enka SK in Istanbul.

Böcekler won the silver medal both in the 800 m freestyle and the 1500 m freestyle  event at the 2019 European Junior Swimming Championships in Kazan, Russia. She captured three gold medals in the  200 m freestyle, the 400 m freestyle and the 800 m freestyle event at the 2019 European Youth Summer Olympic Festival (EYOF) in Baku, Azerbaijan, where she set four Turkish national records in the 200 m, 400 m, 800 m and 1500 m freestyle events in addition to the EYOF records in the 400 m and 800 m events.
She trains at the Turkish Olympic Preparation Center under the Head Coach Gjon Shyti from 2015

References

Living people
2004 births
Sportspeople from Ankara
Turkish female swimmers
Turkish female freestyle swimmers
Enkaspor swimmers
Swimmers at the 2018 Mediterranean Games
Swimmers at the 2022 Mediterranean Games
Mediterranean Games bronze medalists for Turkey
Mediterranean Games medalists in swimming
Swimmers at the 2020 Summer Olympics
Olympic swimmers of Turkey
21st-century Turkish women
Islamic Solidarity Games competitors for Turkey
Islamic Solidarity Games medalists in swimming